The South Korea women's national under-18 volleyball team represents South Korea in women's under-18 volleyball events, it is controlled and managed by the Korea Volleyball Association (KVA) that is a member of Asian volleyball body Asian Volleyball Confederation (AVC) and the international volleyball body government the Fédération Internationale de Volleyball (FIVB).

Team

Coaching staff

Current squad
The following 18 players were called up for the 2018 Asian Girls' U17 Volleyball Championship in Nakhon Pathom, Thailand.

Competition history

Youth Olympic Games
  2010 – Did not qualify

World Championship
 1989 – 4th
 1991 –  Champion
 1993 –  Bronze medal
 1995 – 5th
 1997 – 4th
 1999 –  Bronze medal
 2001 – 9th
 2003 – Did not enter
 2005 – 5th
 2007 – 9th
 2009 – Did not qualify
 2011 – Did not qualify
 2013 – Did not qualify
 2015 – 13th
 2017 – 11th
 2019 – 13th
 2021 – withdrew

Asian Championship
 1997 –  Runner-up
 1999 – 4th
 2001 –  Bronze medal
 2003 – Did not enter
 2005 –  Runner-up
 2007 –  Runner-up
 2008 – 4th 	
 2010 – 4th
 2012 – 4th
 2014 – 4th
 2017 –  Bronze medal
 2018 – 4th
 2020 – Cancelled
 2022 –  Bronze medal

External links
Official website

Women's volleyball in South Korea
National women's under-18 volleyball teams
Volleyball